The Manions of America is a 6-hour mini-series for American television made in 1981.  The subject of the series were Irish immigrants to the United States during the Great Famine of the mid-19th century. It was directed by Joseph Sargent and created by Agnes Nixon, creator of the now-defunct All My Children, a hit daytime TV soap opera that aired on the ABC television network for over 40 years. British dramatist Rosemary Anne Sisson joined Nixon as co-writer.

Manions was the first American role for actor Pierce Brosnan and co-starred Kate Mulgrew, David Soul, Linda Purl, and young up-and-comer Martin O'Neill (who played a kid with a tin whistle). Actor Steve Forrest (younger brother of 1940s movie star Dana Andrews) played a Philadelphia powder mill owner called Kent and uncle of Kate Mulgrew's character Rachel, who begrudgingly hires Rachel's lover and future husband played by Pierce Brosnan.

External links
 

1981 American television series debuts
1981 American television series endings
1980s American television miniseries
Irish-American mass media